Vranjković is a surname. Notable people with the surname include:

Marko Vranjković (born 1990), Slovenian basketball player
Vojislav Vranjković (born 1983), Serbian footballer

Croatian surnames
Serbian surnames